Thomas F. Stroock (October 10, 1925 – December 13, 2009) was an American businessman, ambassador, and a Republican politician from Casper, Wyoming.

Biography

Early life
Born in New York City, Stroock attended Yale University in New Haven, Connecticut, alongside future U.S. President George Herbert Walker Bush. He was a member of Chi Phi Fraternity. After graduation, he served in the United States Marine Corps during World War II and then relocated to Wyoming, where he devoted his remaining years. He was brought to Casper, Wyoming in 1949 by his current employer, the Stanolind Oil and Gas Company.

Career
Upon settling in Casper, he founded several petroleum companies.

He served as a member of the Wyoming State Senate from Natrona County in 1967, from 1971 to 1974, and finally from 1979 to 1989. He was the Senate vice president in 1989. In 1974, he left the state Senate to run unsuccessfully on the GOP ticket for Wyoming's at-large seat in the United States House of Representatives, having been defeated by the incumbent Democrat Teno Roncalio.

In 1989, he was named United States Ambassador to Guatemala by his former Yale classmate President Bush. He held that post until 1992.

In 1989, he was named United States Ambassador to Guatemala by his former Yale classmate President Bush. He held that post until 1992. During his time as ambassador, he fought against drug trafficking. He also had to handle the case of the American nun Dianna Ortiz, who had been abducted, raped, and tortured by the Guatemalan military, with possible complicity of the United States, and whose account he was unwilling to accept.

Personal life
He and his wife, Marta, had four daughters. He died on December 13, 2009 at the age of eighty-four.

References

External links 

 Thomas F. Stroock Papers at the University of Wyoming - American Heritage Center

1925 births
2009 deaths
Businesspeople from New York City
Politicians from Casper, Wyoming
Republican Party Wyoming state senators
American energy industry businesspeople
Ambassadors of the United States to Guatemala
Yale University alumni
United States Marine Corps personnel of World War II
20th-century American politicians
20th-century American businesspeople